Reina Sofía (F-84) is the fourth of six Spanish-builts, based on the American design, of the Spanish Navy.

Construction and career 
Laid down on 12 October 1987, and launched on 19 July 1989, Reina Sofía was commissioned in service on 30 October 1990. She is named for Queen Sofía of Spain.

All of these Spanish frigates have the length of the later Oliver Hazard Perry frigates, and have a wider beam than the US Navy design, and therefore able to carry more top weight. Fin stabilizers are fitted. The ship is staffed by a crew of 200.

On the 200th anniversary of the Battle of Trafalgar in 2005 the Reina Sofía participated in a procession alongside French and British frigates Montcalm and HMS Chatham at the site of the battle.

In 2016, the ship participated in migrant rescue operations in the Mediterranean. The Reina Sofía has also participated in training missions in the Mediterranean with the Egyptian navy.

Gallery

Other units of class

References 

Ships of the Spanish Navy
1989 ships
Santa María-class frigates